Althea Helen "Allie" Coetzee Leslie (born 1963) is a retired rear admiral in the United States Navy who served as Deputy Administrator of the Small Business Administration from August 2017 to April 2018. Prior to her role with the Small Business Administration, she served as Chief of Staff to the Under Secretary of Defense for Acquisition, Technology and Logistics. Coetzee was confirmed as Deputy Administrator of the Small Business Administration by the U.S. Senate on August 3, 2017. She resigned as the Deputy Administrator on April 15, 2018.

Career 
Coetzee graduated from the United States Naval Academy in 1985 and was commissioned as a Supply Corps officer. She went on to receive a Master of Business Administration degree from National University. In graduate school, she was awarded the American Jurisprudence Award in Criminal Law. After transitioning to the United States Navy Reserve in 1993, she had a civilian career working in municipal and state government, retail distribution, medical device manufacturing, and the United States Department of Defense. She was recalled to active duty in 2011.

Coetzee's military awards include the Defense Superior Service Medal, Legion of Merit, Defense Meritorious Service Medal, Meritorious Service Medal, Navy and Marine Corps Commendation Medal, and the Navy and Marine Corps Achievement Medal.

References

External links

1963 births
Living people
Place of birth missing (living people)
Coetzee
National University (California) alumni
Recipients of the Legion of Merit
Female admirals of the United States Navy
United States Navy rear admirals (upper half)
Recipients of the Defense Superior Service Medal
Small Business Administration personnel
Trump administration personnel
21st-century American women